Jonê County (also Cone, Chone, Choni; ; local pronunciation: /tɕɔLnɛ/) is an administrative district in the Gannan Tibetan Autonomous Prefecture, Gansu Province, China. It is one of 58 counties of Gansu. It is part of the Gannan Prefecture. Its postal code is 747600. It is administered from Liulin.

Description
The county covers both banks of the middle section of the Lu-chu. The country town and adjacent Jonê Monastery are on the north bank. The side valleys on the southern side used to be branches of the ancient kingdom of Jonê.

Historical Tibetan Yang Surname Zhouni Tusi
Among Tibetan at Amdo, Jonê exist The Zhouni Tusi, ruled by the Tibetan Ga clan or Mandarin Chinese Yang clan, was a Tusi chiefdom kingdom called Zhouni Kingdom, Choni Kingdom, or Jonê Kingdom ruled by the Gatsang (dga' tshang) family at Tibet. In 1404, whereupon they informed the Ming Emperor Yongle of this fact and were recognized as local rulers, and were given a seal of authority and the surname Yang. The Yangs ruled Zhouni from 1404 until 1949.

List of Kings of Jonê

There are list kings of Jonê Kingdom:

 
 
 
 
   named 
  named 
  named 
   named 
  named 
  named 
  named 
  named 
   named 
  named 
  named 
   named 
  named 
   named 
  named 
   named

History 
"There are traditions of Tibetan soldiers left behind [after the late 10th century] at several border outposts, such as Jonê, where they established viable settlements, and of the remaining Tibetan conscript troops, called the Wun Mo, carving out considerable territory for themselves until they were perhaps absorbed into that amalgam of people of Tibetan stock, which came to form the Hsi Hsia Kingdom (982—1224)."

Jonê was part of a separate kingdom formed, according to legend, after its invasion by warriors who migrated across the mountains from Sichuan conquering the local tribes in 1404. The contemporary descendants of the Jonê royal line claim that their line is Tibetan, and that their ancestors migrated from central Tibet through Sichuan.

The Yongle Emperor (May 2, 1360 – August 12, 1424) named one of these invading warriors hereditary chief (tusi) called Zhouni Tusi, bestowing the family name of "Yang" ("") and an imperial seal upon his line.  The Jonê king (co-ne rgyal-po) established a palace on the north bank of the Tao River. The family holding the Yang seal continued to rule over 48 Tibetan clans in Jonê as an autonomous kingdom from the early 15th century for 23 generations, until 1928, when it was placed under the control of the Lanchow government. In the late Qing Dynasty and Republican Period, many nomadic regions had considerable de facto independence, despite the claims and perspective of the Chinese rulers.

Among the six monasteries in the county, all of them Tibetan Geluk establishments, is the great Jonê Monastery.

The American botanist Joseph Rock spent almost 2 years in Jonê ("Choni", in his spelling) in 1925–26. He resided in the compound of the local chief  (the 19th-generation tusi Yang Jiqing), making it the base for his exploration of southern Gansu and eastern Qinghai. His account of the culture of this "almost unknown Tibetan principality", as he described it, illustrated with color photographs, was published in the National Geographic.

As of 2012, Jonê was apparently closed to foreign visitors.

Administrative divisions
Zhuoni County (卓尼县) is divided to 11 towns 3 townships and 1 ethic townships.

Towns

Townships
 Daogao Township
 Qia'gai Township
 Kangduo Township

Ethic Townships
 Shaowa Tu Township

Climate

See also
 List of administrative divisions of Gansu

Footnotes

References
Cabot, Mabel H. (2003). Vanished Kingdoms: A Woman Explorer in Tibet, China & Mongolia, 1921-1925, pp. 148–157. Aperture Publishers in association with the Peabody Museum, Harvard. .
Dorje, Gyurme (2009). Footprint Tibet Handbook. Footprint Publications, Bath, England. .
Ekvall, Robert B. (1939). "Cultural Relations on the Kansu-Tibetan Border", University of Chicago.
 China County & City Population 1999 FAQ

County-level divisions of Gansu
Gannan Tibetan Autonomous Prefecture